Emilia is a character in the tragedy Othello by William Shakespeare. The character's origin is traced to the 1565 tale, "Un capitano Moro" from Giovanni Battista Giraldi Cinthio's Gli Hecatommithi.  There, the character is described as young and virtuous, is referred to simply as the ensign's wife, and becomes Desdemona's companion in Cyprus. In Shakespeare, she is named Emilia, is the wife of Othello's ensign, Iago, and is an attendant to Othello's wife, Desdemona.  While considered a minor character in the drama, she has been portrayed by several notable actresses on film, with Joyce Redman receiving an Academy Award nomination for her performance.

Sources
Othello has its source in the 1565 tale, "Un Capitano Moro" from Gli Hecatommithi by Giovanni Battista Giraldi Cinthio.  While no English translation of Cinthio was available in Shakespeare's lifetime, it is probable that Shakespeare knew both the Italian original and Gabriel Chappuy's 1584 French translation.  Cinthio's tale may have been based on an actual incident occurring in Venice about 1508.

The only named character in Cinthio's story is "Desdemona". Other characters are identified only as the Moor, the squadron leader, the ensign, and the ensign's wife – the original of Shakespeare's Emilia.  There's no mention in the source of the ensign's wife being Desdemona's attendant.

In Cinthio, the ensign's wife accompanies her husband to Cyprus.  She is described as "a beautiful and virtuous young woman" who, "being of Italian birth,...was much loved by the Moor's wife, who spent the greater part of the day with her."  The ensign, "not heeding at all the vows he had made his wife", lusts after Desdemona who, very much in love with the Moor, is oblivious to the ensign's passion.

In Cinthio, the ensign filches Desdemona's handkerchief when she visits his house and hugs his three-year-old daughter.  It is presumed his wife is present since Cinthio makes clear earlier in the tale that Desdemona often spent part of the day with the ensign's wife.  However, his wife takes no part in the mischief.

The next appearance of the ensign's wife in the tale occurs when Desdemona discusses her husband's troubling behaviour with her.  Here, Cinthio makes clear the ensign's wife is aware of her husband's plotting, but remains silent in fear of him.  She advises Desdemona not to give the Moor any cause for suspicion and to assure him of her love and loyalty.  The last mention of the ensign's wife is in the final sentence of the tale when, long after Desdemona's murder and once her husband is dead, she reveals what she knows of the past.

Role in Othello

Though Emilia is mentioned in 1.3 when Othello asks Iago to allow his wife to accompany Desdemona to Cyprus as her attendant, the character first appears on stage in 2.1 when she disembarks in Cyprus with Iago, Desdemona, and Roderigo. She banters briefly with her companions before leaving the stage, presumabably in Desdemona's entourage.  Though not specifically mentioned, she probably appears as Desdemona's attendant at the beginning of 2.3, then exits and reappears after the brawl which disgraces Cassio. At the end of the scene, Iago is alone and plots to have Emilia "move for Cassio to her mistress".

In 3.1, Cassio asks Emilia, "Give me advantage of some brief discourse with Desdemona alone." and Emilia allows him to enter. In 3.3, Emilia is present when Desdemona and Cassio confer, and present again when Desdemona urges Othello to receive the lieutenant.  In the same scene, Emilia finds Desdemona's handkerchief, but, she hands it over to Iago as he had been urging her to steal it. He takes it and forbids her from mentioning its whereabouts.  In 3.4, when questioned by Desdemona about the handkerchief, Emilia denies any knowledge of it.  After Othello rages over the loss of the handkerchief, Emilia attempts to comfort Desdemona. In 4.2 when questioned by Othello, she firmly states Desdemona's innocence. In 4.3 she later discusses with Desdemona their differing views on marriage and fidelity. Emilia states she would commit adultery if it gained her husband the world and also asserts that husbands are to blame, arguing for equality and mutual respect in marriage. She briefly appears in 5.1 where she verbally abuses Bianca after hearing of her supposed involvement in Cassio's attack. In 5.2 she informs Othello of Roderigo's death and the attempted murder of Cassio. She calls for help and Iago, Montano and Gratiano appear. Emilia having heard from Othello that Iago told him of Desdemona "cheating" on him with Cassio, accuses him of gross dishonesty leading to an unjust murder. When she hears about the handkerchief, she reveals her role and Iago threatens and then kills her at the first opportunity. She then dies singing Desdemona's song and speaking of her purity and love for Othello, lying alongside her mistress.

Analysis
Emilia is a comparatively minor character for much of the play; however, she serves to provide a strong contrast to the romantic and obedient Desdemona, demonstrating that she is both intelligent and distinctly cynical, especially on matters relating to men and marriage – her speech to Desdemona listing the faults and flaws of the male sex in 4.3 is a good example of this (though she does admit that women also have "frailty, as men have"). She also states in the same scene that she would be willing to commit adultery for a sufficiently high price – this shows her cynical and worldly nature in sharp contrast to Desdemona, who seems almost unable to believe that any woman could contemplate such an act.

Throughout the play, Iago uses Emilia's close friendship with Desdemona to gain access to her and, in particular, asks her to steal Desdemona's handkerchief, which he subsequently drops in Cassio's house and later uses this as evidence to convince Othello that Cassio has been with Desdemona. Emilia does not agree to steal the handkerchief for Iago. Iago snatches it from her and all she can do is ask about what he will do with it (III.iii.310–320). Iago is the one who drops the handkerchief in Cassio's chamber. (III.iii.321–322). Later Emilia even lies to Desdemona, saying she doesn't know where it is; it is clear she feels a "divided duty" in this matter between her friend and her husband. She is, however, entirely ignorant of Iago's plans until the very end of the play.

Iago states on two occasions during the play that he suspects Emilia of infidelity with both Othello and Cassio, and this is sometimes suggested as a possible motive for his actions; however, there is little if any evidence within the play to suggest that his suspicions have any basis in reality.

After Desdemona's murder, Emilia first challenges Othello, disregarding his threats towards her, and then, after learning that her own husband instigated the murder, denounces his actions and reveals her own part in finding the handkerchief and passing it on (V.ii.230–231); for this she is stabbed by her husband and dies during the final act.

Emilia on film
In Orson Welles' troubled but critically acclaimed 1952 film Othello, Fay Compton played Emilia opposite Micheál MacLiammóir's Iago.  In a 1965 film, Joyce Redman portrayed Emilia with Laurence Olivier as Othello, Maggie Smith as Desdemona, and Frank Finlay as Iago.  All four performers received Academy Award nominations.  Anna Patrick played Emilia in the 1995 film with Laurence Fishburne as Othello and Kenneth Branagh as Iago. Emilia, renamed Emily, was portrayed by Rain Phoenix in the modernized-adaptation "O". In the critically acclaimed Vishal Bhardwaj's version of Othello, Omkara, the character of Indu which was similar to Emilia was portrayed by Konkona Sen Sharma, earning her the Filmfare Best Supporting Actress Award as well as the National Award for Best Supporting Actress

References

External links

Literary characters introduced in 1603
Fictional Italian people in literature
Female Shakespearean characters
Othello
Uxoricide in fiction
Fictional victims of domestic abuse